Hanzel und Gretyl für immer ("Hanzel und Gretyl forever") is a remix album by American industrial metal band Hanzel und Gretyl and a companion album to 2012's Born to Be Heiled. It was released via Metropolis Records on October 8, 2013.

Track listing

Personnel 
 Kaizer von Loopy – vocals, guitar, programming
 Vas Kallas – lead vocals, bass
 KyzrWolf – remixes

External links 
Official Hanzel und Gretyl website
Official MySpace page
Metropolis Records

Hanzel und Gretyl albums
2013 albums
German-language albums
Metropolis Records albums